Opta Sports, formerly Opta Sportsdata and more commonly known as Opta, is a British sports analytics company. Opta provides data for more than 30 sports in over 70 countries, with clients ranging from leagues and federations to broadcasters and betting websites. The company was founded in 1996, and acquired by Perform Group in 2013. In turn, Perform Group was acquired by Vista Equity Partners in 2019, merging it with STATS LLC to form Opta's current parent company, Stats Perform.

History

Opta Index Limited was founded in 1996 to analyze Premier League football matches and was contracted by Sky Sports for their television broadcasts of the 1996–97 season. The following season, Opta became the official statistics provider for the league itself and became sponsored by Carling. In June 1999, Opta was acquired by internet betting service Sports Internet Group for £3.9 million. Sky Group acquired the Sports Internet Group in 2000 and sold Opta to Sportingstatz Limited, a data service co-founded by Aidan Cooney.

Opta debuted its current real-time data collection process for football matches in 2006, leading to an expansion in new data offerings across different sports. In 2011, the company entered the US market when it opened an office in New York and partnered with Major League Soccer.

Offices
Opta is headquartered in London with additional offices in Europe located in Limerick, Aveiro, Munich, Bassano del Grappa, Milan, Paris, Madrid, and Amsterdam. The company opened offices in New York City and Sydney in 2011.

References

External links

Sports mass media in the United Kingdom
Companies based in the City of Westminster
British companies established in 2001
Sports records and statistics
2001 establishments in England
2001 in London
Data companies